MTV Splitsvilla is an Indian television dating reality show that airs on MTV India. The show was formerly hosted by Nikhil Chinapa and Rannvijay Singha. In 2022, Arjun Bijlani replaced Rannvijay, hosting the 14th season alongside Sunny Leone.

Summary
The show revolves around young men and women trying to secure a place in Splitsvilla, a villa where they are detached from the real world. Participants compete in tasks to remain in the competition and mingle with their fellow contestants to find love. In the end, a pair are crowned the winners of Splitsvilla.

Seasons overview

Splitsvilla

Wild Villa

References

External links 

Indian reality television series
2008 Indian television series debuts
MTV (Indian TV channel) original programming
Hindi-language television shows
Flavor of Love
Dating and relationship reality television series